Katie Saylor (born October 23, 1951) is a former American actress.

Early life
Adopted as a baby by fashion designer Larry Aldrich, Saylor was born and raised in Connecticut and studied with the American Theater Wing/Academy of Dramatic Arts in New York City and at the Shelton Actors Lab in San Francisco.

Career
After beginning her acting career in off-Broadway theatre, Saylor relocated to Los Angeles in 1973 and worked primarily as a B movie actress prior to landing the female lead in the short-lived (10 episodes)  NBC-TV science fiction series The Fantastic Journey.  The show premiered on February 3, 1977, with Saylor playing Liana, "daughter of an Atlantean father and an extraterrestrial mother", who was introduced in the second episode. Saylor appeared in seven episodes, then was absent from the last two episodes of the series. She retired from acting due to illness at that time.

Personal life
Saylor married attorney Harvey Strassman in November 1976. Strassman represented Noah Dietrich in Dietrich's lawsuit against his long-time employer Howard Hughes. , Katie and Harvey Strassman resided in the Studio City neighborhood of Los Angeles.

Filmography
Invasion of the Bee Girls (1973) - Gretchen Grubowsky
Men of the Dragon (1974, TV film) - Lisa Kimbro
Dirty O'Neil (1974) - Vera
The Swinging Barmaids (1975) - Susie
Supervan (1977) - Karen Trenton
The Fantastic Journey (1977, TV series) - Liana

References

External links

1951 births
Living people
20th-century American actresses
21st-century American women